The 1991 Bulgarian Cup Final was played at the Ivaylo Stadium in Veliko Tarnovo on 29 May 1991, and was contested between the sides of Levski Sofia and Botev Plovdiv. The match was won by Levski Sofia.

Match

Details

See also
1990–91 A Group

References

Bulgarian Cup finals
Botev Plovdiv matches
PFC Levski Sofia matches
Cup Final